Jean-Marc Hamel,  (born February 19, 1925) is a Canadian government official. He was the Chief Electoral Officer from 1966 to 1990.

Born in Lotbinière, Quebec, he received a Bachelor of Commerce degree in 1948 and a Master of Commerce degree in 1949 from Université Laval. He received a M.P.A. from Syracuse University in 1956.

In 1990, he was made an Officer of the Order of Canada for "his ability to work with political parties, candidates, the media and the general public helped to foster the atmosphere of confidence now associated with the entire Canadian electoral system".

He was predeceased by his wife Jacqueline in April 2002.

References

Sources
 Elections Canada biography
 Canadian Who's Who 1997 entry

1925 births
Living people
Canadian civil servants
Officers of the Order of Canada
People from Chaudière-Appalaches
Université Laval alumni
Syracuse University alumni
Chief Electoral Officer (Canada)